Bolma kreipli is a species of sea snail, a marine gastropod mollusk in the family Turbinidae, the turban snails.

Distribution
This marine species occurs off New Caledonia.

References

External links
 To Encyclopedia of Life
 To World Register of Marine Species
 Muséum Nationale d'Histoire naturelle: Bolma kreipli

kreipli
Gastropods described in 2010